Los fanfarrones is a 1960 Mexican western comedy film directed by Rogelio A. González, and starring Miguel Aceves Mejía, Flor Silvestre, Julio Aldama, Mauricio Garcés, Irma Dorantes, Verónica Loyo, and Joaquín García Vargas.

References

External links
 
 Los fanfarrones at the Instituto Mexicano de Cinematografía

1960 films
Mexican Western (genre) comedy films
1960s Western (genre) comedy films
Films directed by Rogelio A. González
1960 comedy films
1960s Mexican films